Eastern Cemetery is a 28-acre cemetery located at 641 Baxter Avenue in Louisville, Kentucky, United States, abutting Cave Hill Cemetery. It contains about 16,000 graves, though documentation for about 138,000 bodies. This imbalance is due to the cemetery formerly being a site for mass paupers' graves and from the reuse of grave sites.

History
Originally known as The Methodist, the 28-acre Eastern Cemetery is located at 641 Baxter Avenue in Louisville, Kentucky, United States, abutting Cave Hill Cemetery. The grounds were purchased by two Methodist Episcopal churches and used for burials by 1844. It hosted Louisville's first crematoriums. Louisville Crematories and Cemetery Corporation owned the cemetery by the late 1980s.

By the mid 19th century, mass paupers' graves were used for burial in Eastern Cemetery. , the site has about 16,000 graves, and documentation for about 138,000 bodies. The pauper's graves contribute to the imbalance, but the public learned in 1989 that owners also had been reusing purchased grave sites. The property has fallen into disrepair since this news was brought to light, with neither Kentucky nor the original owners accepting ownership and financial responsibility for restorations. Louisville Crematories and Cemetery Corporation was dissolved, and its perpetual care fund lacks functional interest. Maintenance is currently provided by veterans, volunteer groups like the Friends of Eastern Cemetery, and Dismas Charities.

Mismanagement
In 1989, a whistleblower working for Louisville Crematories and Cemetery Company made the public aware that graves purchased by families had been reused. Bodies were buried atop other bodies, graves were carelessly excavated for reuse, and medical cadaver body parts from the University of Louisville were buried in-mass rather than intact (as is legally required for donated bodies). Human bones were found in inappropriate areas, including in a tool box, a glove compartment, a fast food bag, and shallow graves. Some of the behavior had been practiced since the 1920s, and records indicate reuse began in 1858. Officials resigned and were charged with 60 counts of charges that included reuse of graves and abuse of corpses, but there were no legal consequences. The behavior is the subject of the 2017 documentary Facing East, referring to Eastern as "the most over-buried cemetery in America".

People interred at Eastern Cemetery
 Henry Bidleman Bascom, (1796–1850), minister and former President of Transylvania University
 Hercules Burnett, (1865–1936), Baseball player
 Daniel Abraham Gaddie, (1836–1911), Baptist minister
 Valentine "Wall" Hatfield (1834-1890), participant in the Hatfield-McCoy Feud
 Arthur Samuel "Art" Payne, (1900–1965), Bandleader, jazz musician and Gennett Records recording artist of the 1920s and 1930s
 Felton Snow, (1905-1974), Negro League Baseball player, buried in an unmarked grave
 William Henry Steward, (1847–1935), journalist
 Bartlett Taylor, (1815–1901), African Methodist Episcopal minister
 Philip Tomppert, (1808–1873), Louisville mayor

References

External links
 "Louisville's Crumbling Eastern Cemetery Desperate for Attention, Care"
 
 "Thousands Buried in Old Graves, Investigators in Kentucky Report"
 "Eastern Cemetery more a party site than resting place, says group"
 "Troubles continue at Louisville's Eastern Cemetery
 Facing East @ IMDb
 "Friends of Eastern Cemetery"

Cemeteries in Kentucky
Buildings and structures in Louisville, Kentucky
1840s establishments in Kentucky
History of Louisville, Kentucky